Nambucca Heads is a town on the Mid North Coast of New South Wales, Australia in the Nambucca Valley. It is located on a ridge, north of the estuary of the Nambucca River near the Pacific Highway. Its 2021 population was 6,675 (6,327 in 2016 census, 6,137 in 2011 census), including 5,226 (78.3%) Australian-born persons and 672 indigenous persons. 

The place name is derived from an Gumbaynggirr word Ngambagabaga. Clement Hodgkinson asked two Ngamba men what the name of the area was they responded to Nyambagabaga as the spot they were standing was a bend in the river where a Ngamba giant was speared in the leg in the Dreaming. This location is the Foreshore Caravan Park now. Ngamba is a subsection of Gumbaynggirr Nation & Baga Baga means Knee. This was later interpreted as Nambucca. It is a popular holiday and retirement destination.

The town is located on the North Coast railway line, and is served by the three daily New South Wales XPT services.

History

Nambucca Heads is the current and historical homeland of the Gumbaynggirr people. Gumbaynggirr lands stretch from Pillar Valley, Tyndale, Grafton and Copmanhurst in the north, to Glen Innes, Guyra and Black Mountain to the west, and to Bowraville to the south. The Nambucca River separated the Gumbaynggirr from the Dunghutti Ngaku. The name Nambucca comes from an Aboriginal word, ngambugka, variously translated as "winding or crooked river", and as "entrance to the waters."

Europeans may have explored the area in 1818, and John Oxley surveyed the area in 1820.

The cutting of Australian red cedar had started in the area by 1842.  It is believed that the first house was built in 1867, when about 50 people had settled in the valley to cut cedar or grow corn.  The site of the town was surveyed in 1874 and the first hotel and school were both established in 1884.  It was proclaimed a village in 1885.
The North Coast railway was extended from Taree to South Grafton in 1915, but Nambucca Heads station was not opened until 1923.

Nambucca Heads has one of the oldest surf lifesaving clubs in Australia and also invented junior surf lifesaving known as Nippers.

Local media

Radio Stations
2CS-FM (106.3), Star FM (105.5 & 105.1), 2MC-FM (106.7), Triple J (91.5 & 96.3), 2NVR FM (105.9)

The Nambucca Valley's community radio station, 2NVR 105.9FM, focuses on the Macksville, Bowraville, Nambucca Heads and surrounding communities.

Newspapers
Midcoast Observer, Hibiscus Happynings, Guardian News, Coffs Coast Advocate.

Television
ABC, ABC2, SBS, SBS viceland, Prime7 Coffs Harbour (Prime), Southern Cross Ten (Ten), NBN

Schools
 Nambucca Heads Public School
 Frank Partridge V.C Public School
 Nambucca Valley Christian Community School
 Nambucca Heads High School

Transport
Nambucca Heads railway station, opened in 1923, on the North Coast Line.  It is serviced by six NSW TrainLink trains per day.

References

Towns in New South Wales
Mid North Coast
Coastal towns in New South Wales